Alexander Archibald (December 13, 1869 – February 11, 1922) served as Mayor of Newark, New Jersey, from 1921 until his death the following year.

Biography
Archibald was born on December 13, 1869, in Scotland to William and Margaret Archibald.  He and his parents immigrated to the United States in 1871 and settled in Newark, New Jersey.

After serving on the City Council, Archibald was elected Mayor of Newark in 1921.

He died Saturday, February 11, 1922, after surgery for a brain tumor.

References

Mayors of Newark, New Jersey
Scottish emigrants to the United States
1869 births
1922 deaths
Politicians from Edinburgh
Deaths from brain cancer in the United States